The Open Space Theatre was created by Charles Marowitz and Thelma Holt in 1968.
It began in a basement on Tottenham Court Road in London, then transferred to an art deco post office on the Euston Road in 1976. Thelma attracted a team of volunteer architects and workers to build the theatre (including David Schofield). And its first production was Charles Marowitz' adaptation of the Merchant of Venice ('The Merchant') starring Vladek Sheybal. Natasha Pyne played Ophelia in a Charles Marowitz's adaptation of Shakespeare's 'Hamlet' at the Open Space Theatre at Tottenham Court Road in July 1969.  
The company operated until around 1980.

Jinnie Schiele's book (University of Hertfordshire Press, 2006) relates the history of the Open Space with that of Holt's later venue, the Roundhouse.

References

External links 
The Round House and Open Space theatre companies records are held by the Victoria and Albert Museum Theatre and Performance Department.

Former theatres in London
Former buildings and structures in the London Borough of Camden
1968 establishments in England
1980 disestablishments in England
Art Deco architecture in London